Cynthia "Cindy" Shatto (June 19, 1957 – October 3, 2011) was a Canadian diver. She won a gold medal in the 1974 British Commonwealth Games 3 metre springboard event and competed in the women's 10 metre platform event at the 1976 Summer Olympics, where she finished fifth following controversy over the judges' scoring.

Shatto began competitive diving when she was 8 years old and won nearly all diving events of her age group. To further develop her skills, in 1970 she and fellow diver Linda Cuthbert moved into the family home of her coach Don Webb, where she would train for up to five hours a day, six days a week, only taking rest on Sunday. Around the age of 14, she was admitted to hospital in the early 1970s and needed her gall bladder removed due to eating too much greasy food, leaving her weak and unable to train during the winter of 1971–1972. During the mid-1970s in-between competing at the 1974 Commonwealth Games and the 1976 Olympics, she lost interest in the sport and her attitude changed when she compared her lifestyle to that of others who did not have the pressures of international competitions, but was encouraged by fellow diver Beverly Boys to reflect positively on the sport and thereafter began serious practicing again from around August 1975.

Shatto retired from competitive diving in 1978 after growing tired of a nomadic lifestyle and in summer 1990 moved with her family to Binghamton, New York where she became a diving coach at Binghamton University. She died of lung cancer in October 2011 at the age of 54.

Career

Childhood and early development
Born in June 1957, Shatto began roller skating at the age of 2 and later took up acrobatics, modern dance and learnt to play the violin. She started competitive diving at the age of 8 in her family's backyard pool in Willowdale, Toronto. Her father would play diving games with her, using a long garbage sweeping pole for her to run and leap over "like a porpoise". Under the early coaching of John Dickinson, Shatto won "just about every age-group meet she entered". Among her first recognised competitions was the Ontario under-10s 1-metre diving championships, where at the  age of 8 she scored 84.20 points and won in her age group. At the age of 9, she practiced  platform diving at the open-air pool in Summerville, occasionally being blown by wind from the tower due to its location near the edge of Lake Ontario. Despite the extreme cold weather conditions, she persevered. A few weeks after her ninth birthday, she became the Ontario diving champion in the girls under-10 age category with a score of 132.75 and followed it up by becoming the United States diving champion in her age group.

By the age of 10, she had experience with playing the violin, acrobatics, contemporary dancing and baton twirling. Her mother described her as persistent, saying that "if she discovered something she couldn't master, she'd get mad, sulk, but stick it out until she got better." Shortly before turning 11, as a member of the Etobicoke Diving Club, she won the under-14 tower event in the Ontario open championships, which brought her competitive record to 26 first place finishes, two second placed finishes and one third place finish across 29 events. Shortly before her 12th birthday, she finished runner-up in the 1969 Ontario open 3-metre diving championships in the girls' under-15 category. At the age of 13, she was invited to train with national coach Don Webb, requiring her to live with Webb's family for around three years, the first two years being in Winnipeg.

During her earlier years, she frequently age excessive amounts of chips and gravy, with other children using it as her nickname. Having been admitted to hospital with constant stomach pains due to excessive greasy food, her gallbladder was removed which left her weak and unable to train during the winter of 1971–1972.

Competitive diving
By 1973, she had been living with Don Webb's family for three years and would train up to five hours daily for six days a week, or longer when preparing for a major competition. She and Linda Cuthbert, another diver who also lived with the Webb family, would train for an hour at lunchtime, with a heavier workload on Saturday and a rest day on Sunday. Describing her life in 1973 up to that point, she expressed that "Diving has been my whole life, just about. I enjoy it. I like the competition, the travel and I like meeting people. It has kept me from being bored." Shatto would show little emotion during a competition, except upon winning and did not like her father watching her diving as they would both get nervous. In the same year, she represented her country at the world championships held in Yugoslavia.

In 1974, under Webb's coaching, Shatto won a gold medal in the British Commonwealth Games in Christchurch in the 3 metre springboard diving event. Following her Commonwealth success, she had established herself as the likeliest contender in Canada to win a gold medal in the 1976 Summer Olympics, having been described as "one of Canada's best divers". Don Webb described her as being a natural diver with class, suggesting that "what other divers have to learn comes naturally to her. She's got the style and determination".

Depression
Prior to competing at the 1976 Olympics, she went through a depressive period around 1974 and 1975, admitting she "lost the sparkle" for competitive diving as well as having a poorer attitude. Her performances around this time were described as only "barely" reflecting her talent as a top three diver in Canada and considered retiring from the sport to live a more traditional lifestyle. Her father, described as a perfectionist, did not understand her reversal in attitude or when she expressed her lack of interest in diving. Her older sister Becky was recognised in high school as being a "female athlete of the year", without the pressures of competition. Shatto began to compare her lifestyle to that of her sister's, thinking that "her life just started to look better than mine". After a period of reflection, she considered the positive aspects, including international travel and the people she had met. She was offered advice by fellow diver Beverly Boys which she said had "helped put me back together again". She began serious practicing again around August 1975 and accepted that, while happy with her performances, if she were to perform poorly it would be due to lack of practice and not attitude.

Olympics and beyond
She had taken a year out of high school in 1976 to train for the Olympics full time. Shortly after turning 19, Shatto competed in the 1976 Olympics and was in second place in the women's 10 metre platform after five of eight dives, but dropped to fifth position following a sixth dive that was scored controversially. The Montreal Gazette at the time expressed the opinion that she had been "cheated out of at least a bronze", suggesting the Soviet and Swedish judges were bias when marking the dives, although Shatto felt that finishing fifth in the world was acceptable. Following the Olympics, she took six-month sabbatical after feeling "physically let down" by not winning anything in the competition. Prior to this, she had not taken more than three weeks off at a time. She returned to training in July 1977 to prepare for the world championships in 1978, practicing diving four to five hours a day.

Retirement
On the eve of the 1978 Commonwealth Games, Shatto announced her retirement from competitive diving at the age of 21, citing the "nomadic life of a world-class athlete" as being the primary factor in her loss of interest. She admitted that her Olympic controversy two years prior was a contributing factor as well as losing motivation, instead preferring to get a job and earn her own money.

Later life

In later life, she was an executive secretary with Xerox around 1987 and later an assistant to the owner of Mundial International. In June 1990, she relocated with her family to Binghamton, New York where her husband grew up, having grown tired of Florida. It was the first time Shatto had lived in a small town, which she liked due to being "family-oriented". She answered an advertisement in September 1990 for a job as a diving coach and was successful at securing the role at Binghamton University, which her husband later noted had a positive effect on her. During a 1977 interview, she had expressed reluctance to enter coaching, believing that she did not have the "outgoing personality" that was needed to get divers to do the dives she would want them to.

Personal
Born as Cynthia Shatto in June 1957, her father, Dick Shatto, was a professional Canadian football player and member of the Canadian Football Hall of Fame. and her mother was Lynne Shatto (nee Garlough). Cindy was the third of five children and attended Rideau High School.

A long-term resident of Florida, Shatto was married to William "Bill" Weingartner in February 1985, having first met in 1979 when she entered a restaurant in Tarpon Springs that Weingartner managed, in search of a job following her retirement from diving. He recalled that he "instantly fell in love", at the time unaware of her sporting achievements until their relationship developed. They had two sons born in the 1980s, Richard who also took up diving and Christopher.

She died of lung cancer in October 2011 at the age of 54, following a two year battle.

References

External links
 

1957 births
2011 deaths
Deaths from lung cancer in Florida
Divers at the 1976 Summer Olympics
Canadian female divers
Olympic divers of Canada
Divers from Toronto
Canadian people of American descent
Divers at the 1974 British Commonwealth Games
Commonwealth Games medallists in diving
Commonwealth Games gold medallists for Canada
Medallists at the 1974 British Commonwealth Games